Michel Girouard (August 22, 1944 – April 9, 2021) was a Quebec journalist.

Biography 
During his childhood, Michel Girouard participated in Les ondes enfantines, which was broadcast on CBC television.
At the age of 17, he was asked to become editor of the weekly La Patrie, which targeted young people. With Joël Denis, he also co-hosted the CKAC radio program "Salut les copains" that focused on youth.

In the following years, Michel Girouard launched some 45 rpm recordings, including:
 School and love
 You who were my friend
 The big day
 Arm in arm
On February 18, 1972, Michel Girouard and the pianist Réjean Tremblay got married while same-sex marriage was still not recognized in Canada. Radio host Hughette Proulx publicly defended it.
Since then, Michel became an artistic columnist in several television shows like The Garden of Stars.
Always accompanied by his dogs, he is a spokesperson for Pattes de l'espoir, which is a march-o-thon with dogs in order to raise funds for the fight against cancer.

References 

1944 births
2021 deaths
French Quebecers
Canadian LGBT journalists
Writers from Quebec
Canadian gay writers
Canadian non-fiction writers in French
20th-century Canadian male writers
Canadian male non-fiction writers
20th-century Canadian journalists
20th-century Canadian LGBT people